Gabriel García-Badell Lapetra (28 May 1936 – 11 March 1994) was a Spanish writer. He received a degree in law and is linked to Aragon, where he worked as a lawyer for the IRYDA (Institute of agricultural reform and development).

His first novel was "Las manos de mi padre", published in 1968, a monologue in which the protagonist returns to his paternal home after a 4 years voyage.

He was a four-time runner-up for the Premio Nadal, a record.

References 

Spanish male novelists
1936 births
1994 deaths
20th-century Spanish novelists
20th-century Spanish male writers